The Asian Netball Championship is a netball competition held every two years with teams from across Asia competing. First 7 editions were held every four years, then changed to every two years starting from 2012. Sri lanka is the reigning champion of the tournament and also the most successful team, having won the Asian Netball Championships 6 times. Singapore has 3 championships and Malaysia has two. From the first edition of the tournament held in 1985, Sri Lanka, Singapore and Malaysia dominated the tournament by always finishing within the top three. Only exception is the 3rd edition of the tournament held in 1993 where host nation Hong kong managed to win the championship.

Results

Participating nations

See also
 Asian Youth Netball Championship

References

 
Quadrennial sporting events
International netball competitions
Netball_Championships
Recurring sporting events established in 1985
Netball competitions in Asia
1985 establishments in Malaysia